Nègrepelisse is a commune in the Tarn-et-Garonne department in the Occitanie region in southern France. It lies on the river Aveyron. The village was the setting for the Nègrepelisse massacre, which took place in 1622.

Population

See also
Communes of the Tarn-et-Garonne department

References

Communes of Tarn-et-Garonne
Quercy
Tarn-et-Garonne communes articles needing translation from French Wikipedia